Nauf AlBendar also known as Nauf Bendar Al Saud or Nouf Bandar Al Saud is a Saudi Arabian  medical scientist known for researching on human health. She is a doctor of Clinical Medicine in DOHaD, and the  Founder of  The Womb Effect and Lahd Gallery.

Education 
AlBendar  holds  a BSc in Molecular Genetics and Genomics, and an MSc in Nutrition & Food Science. She also holds a PhD in clinical medicine with a speciality in Developmental Origins of Health and Disease (DOHaD) from Imperial College London.

Career 
AlBendar began her career as a genetic researcher at the King Faisal Hospital in Riyadh, Saudi Arabia, in 2005.  She also founded Lahd Gallery as a pioneering platform for showcasing the contemporary works of emerging regional artists.

In  2019, AlBendar launched The Womb Effect, an educational platform for aspiring, expectant and new parents. She is a fellow of the Royal Society of Medicine and a member of the International DOHaD Society.

Awards and recognition 
2011 -  Shortlisted as the Woman of the Future in Arts, Media, and Culture at the Women of the Future Awards.

2015 - Distinguished Honoree of the UN Millennium Development Goals: Progress Award for her work with the gallery .

See also 
 Lahd Gallery

References

External links
 The Womb Effect website

Living people
Saudi Arabian medical doctors
Saudi Arabian scientists
Year of birth missing (living people)